The Korg M1 is a synthesizer and music workstation manufactured by Korg from 1988 to 1995.  According to Sound on Sound, it is one of the bestselling synthesizers, selling an estimated 250,000 units.

Development
Korg's chief engineer, Junichi Ikeuchi, led the hardware engineering design of the M1. Whereas previous synthesizers had shipped with sounds chosen for different markets, the Korg chairman, Tsutomu Kato, and his son Seiki decided that their synthesizers should use the same sounds internationally. Korg assembled an international team to develop the sounds for the M1. To create a deep blown bottle sound, the team played a pan flute over a large sake bottle.

Features 

The M1 features a 61-note velocity- and aftertouch-sensitive keyboard, 16-note polyphony with 1-oscillator Programs (or 8-note polyphony with 2-oscillator Programs), a joystick for pitch-bend and modulation control, an eight-track MIDI sequencer, separate LFOs for vibrato and filter modulation, and ADSR envelopes. Data can be stored on RAM and PCM cards.

The M1 has a ROM with four megabytes of 16-bit PCM tones, including, according to Sound on Sound, "exotic instruments that previously hadn't been heard in the mainstream". The sounds include sampled attack transients, loops, sustained waveforms without attack transients, and percussive samples. The timbres include piano, strings, acoustic guitar, woodwinds, sitar, kalimba, wind chimes, and drums.

The M1 also features effects including reverb, delay, chorus, tremolo, EQ, distortion, and Leslie simulation, an innovative inclusion at the time. According to Sound on Sound, none of the M1's features were unique, but were implemented and combined in a new way.

Legacy 
The Korg M1 was released in 1988 and manufactured until 1995, selling an estimated 250,000 units. The Sound on Sound journalist Mark Vail wrote in 2002 that it was the bestselling synthesizer in history and could "rightly be called the most popular synth of all time", though he noted that Korg had not verified the sales figures. The M1 piano and organ presets were widely used in 1990s house music, beginning with Madonna's 1990 single "Vogue".

References

Further reading

External links
Korg M1 video demo and review in Japanese

Music workstations
M
Digital synthesizers
Polyphonic synthesizers
Musical instruments invented in the 1980s